Sérgio Vieira de Mello (15 March 1948 – 19 August 2003) was a Brazilian United Nations diplomat who worked on several UN humanitarian and political programs for over 34 years. The Government of Brazil posthumously awarded the Sergio Vieira de Mello Medal to honor his legacy in promoting sustainable peace, international security and better living conditions for individuals in situations of armed conflict, challenges to which Sérgio Vieira de Mello had dedicated his life and career.

He was killed in the Canal Hotel bombing in Iraq along with 20 other members of his staff on 19 August 2003 while working as UN High Commissioner for Human Rights, with the rank of Undersecretary General, and United Nations Special Representative for Iraq. Before his death, he was considered a likely candidate for UN Secretary-General.

Biography and professional career
Vieira de Mello was born in Rio de Janeiro to the diplomat Arnaldo Vieira de Mello and his wife Gilda on 15 March 1948. He had an older sister, Sônia, who suffered schizophrenia throughout her adult life. The family followed Arnaldo's diplomatic postings, such that Sérgio spent his early years in Buenos Aires, Genoa, Milan, Beirut and Rome. In 1965, he was studying philosophy at the Federal University of Rio de Janeiro, but since classes were frequently disrupted by strikes, he opted to continue his education in Europe. He continued at the University of Paris, where he studied philosophy under Vladimir Jankélévitch. While there, he stayed at an apartment at the Maison de l’Argentine, the student housing at the Cité Internationale Universitaire de Paris dedicated to students with families from Latin America. He participated in the 1968 student riots in Paris against the Charles de Gaulle government, and was hit in the head by a police baton, causing a permanent disfigurement above his right eye. He also wrote a letter published in the French leftist journal Combat in support of the riots, which made his return to Brazil, at this stage a military dictatorship, potentially dangerous. Thus, after graduating from the Sorbonne in 1969, he moved to Geneva to stay with a family friend, and found his first job as an editor at the United Nations High Commissioner for Refugees (UNHCR).

From UNHCR, Vieira de Mello moved to the field in Bangladesh during its War of Independence in 1971, and Sudan in 1972 following the Addis Ababa agreement which ended the First Sudanese Civil War and allowed the return of some 650,000 Sudanese refugees and displaced persons, and Cyprus after the Turkish part of Cyprus in 1974. These early assignments were operational, rather than political; he was helping to organize food aid, shelter and other types of aid to refugees. Sergio remained in the field, with a posting in Mozambique to assist refugees fleeing white rule and civil war in Zimbabwe (at the time, still Rhodesia) where he was deputy head of the office. Due to the absence of his boss, he was effectively running the mission.

Early in his career, he also completed an MA in moral philosophy and a PhD by correspondence from the Sorbonne. His doctorate thesis, submitted in 1974, was entitled The Role of Philosophy in Contemporary Society. In 1985, he submitted a second "state" doctorate, the highest degree in the French education system, entitled Civitas Maxima: Origins, Foundations and Philosophical and Political Significance of the Supranationality Concept. In addition to his native Portuguese, Vieira de Mello was fluent in English, Spanish, Italian and French, as well as some conversational Arabic and Tetum.

Vieira de Mello spent three years in charge of UNHCR operations in Mozambique during the civil war that followed its independence from Portugal in 1975, and three more years in Peru. Vieira de Mello also served as Special Envoy for the UNHCR for Cambodia, being the first and only UN Representative to hold talks with the Khmer Rouge. He became senior political adviser to the United Nations Interim Force in Lebanon between 1981 and 1983. In 1985, he returned to Latin America to serve as head of the Argentina office in Buenos Aires.

Sérgio spent the 1990s involved in the clearing of land mines in Cambodia, and then in Yugoslavia. After working on the refugee problem in central Africa, he was made Assistant High Commissioner for Refugees in 1996 and became UN Undersecretary-General for Humanitarian Affairs and Emergency Relief Coordinator two years later. He would hold this position simultaneously with others until January 2001. He was a special UN envoy in Kosovo after the UN took control over the Serbian province in 1999.

Vieira de Mello was instrumental in dealing with the issue of boat people in Hong Kong. In mid-2000, he visited Fiji together with Don McKinnon, the Commonwealth of Nations' Secretary-General, in an attempt to assist in finding a negotiated settlement to the hostage situation, in which Fiji's Prime Minister and other members of Parliament were kidnapped and held as hostages during the 2000 Fijian coup d'état.

Before becoming the UN High Commissioner for Human Rights in 2002, he was the UN Transitional Administrator in East Timor from December 1999 to May 2002, guiding the former Portuguese colony occupied by Indonesia to independence. He was also special representative in Kosovo for an initial period of two months and was the coordinator of humanitarian operations at UN Headquarters.

In May 2003 Vieira de Mello was appointed as the Special Representative of the UN Secretary General to Iraq, an appointment initially intended to last for four months. According to The New York Times Magazine journalist James Traub in his book The Best Intentions, Vieira de Mello turned down the appointment three times before Kofi Annan was pressured by US President George W. Bush and Condoleezza Rice. According to Samantha Power in her book Sérgio: One Man's Fight to Save the World, Vieira de Mello met Bush at a meeting in March 2003, at which the two men discussed the human rights situation in the Guantanamo Bay detention camp, a controversial issue for the United States. In June 2003, Vieira de Mello was part of a team responsible for inspecting Abu Ghraib prison before it was rebuilt.

Death

Vieira de Mello was working as United Nations Special Representative for Iraq when he was killed in the Canal Hotel bombing. Abu Musab al-Zarqawi, a leader of the al-Qaeda terrorist organization, claimed responsibility for the blast. A communiqué from al-Qaeda said that de Mello was assassinated because he had helped East Timor become an independent state, thereby stealing territory from the Islamic caliphate.

He had been mentioned in some circles as a suitable candidate for UN Secretary-General. His death was widely mourned, largely on account of his reputation for effectively working to promote peace. Despite his stated wishes to be buried in Rio de Janeiro, his hometown, the place he lived for 34 years, and where he was given a state funeral with full military honors that was attended by President Luiz Inácio Lula da Silva, and other international dignitaries, his body was taken away from Brazil and he was buried at the Cimetière des Rois in Geneva, Switzerland. He was survived by his two sons, Adrien and Laurent.

Personal life
In 1973, he met and married Annie Personnaz, a French staff member at UNHCR Headquarters in Geneva, with whom he had two sons, Laurent and Adrien. They lived in the French town of Thonon-les-bains, before moving a few years later to a permanent home in the French village of Massongy, near the Geneva border.

Despite still being married, the couple was separated for years prior to Sérgio's death, with a divorce lawsuit on January 9, 2003. After an initial hearing in May, Sérgio was bound to pay alimony to his formal spouse, but he also accepted full responsibility for, among other things, assuming the entire expenses of his sons regarding maintenance and education.

Sérgio and Carolina had a civil union that lasted until his death. The civil union was the result of a lawsuit won by Larriera against his estranged wife, heirs and the estate, and was granted by a panel of three magistrates led by Judge Regina Fábregas Ferreira of the Family Court of the Capital District, Judiciary, Rio de Janeiro, Brazil, after a process of more than ten years.

Vieira de Mello presented his partner as fiancée to many friends and colleagues. This included King Norodom Sihanouk of Cambodia, a friend from the period he worked in the country, after visiting him while touring through Asia. The couple traveled to Brazil and Argentina to meet Sergio's and Carolina's family and introduce them to one another, and it is suggested that Sergio wanted to marry Carolina as soon as he was officially divorced. They intended to return to Switzerland after the mission in Iraq – where he would be reinstalled as High Commissioner for Human Rights – and, from there, establish their home and family.

Carolina was summoned by Sérgio to work alongside him in Iraq, and therefore was at the Canal Hotel on the day of the bombing. She witnessed first responders trying to save Vieira de Mello from the wreckage of the building and even managed to establish contact with him moments before his death.

Though the relationship was very familiar to colleagues at the UN, the entity fails to recognize officially the civil union between Sergio and Carolina, even after its recognition by the Judiciary branch in Brazil. Carolina claims that she was excluded from the list of survivors of the Canal Hotel bombing, and her comments were not taken into account for the report regarding the attack. After his death, she was not invited to any of the United Nations celebrations of his life, while the ex-wife Annie was indicated by the UN as Sergio's widow.

Annie still lives in France, and has co-founded a Swiss charity – the Sérgio Vieira de Mello Foundation – with his two sons and close friends and colleagues to honor his name and memory. Adrien and Laurent now have five children, Sérgio's grandchildren.

Carolina was received by Sérgio's family back in Rio de Janeiro, where she now lives with her mother-in-law, Gilda Vieira de Mello.

Awards and recognition
Vieira de Mello received a number of posthumous awards and honours, chief of which was the Legion d'honneur, France's highest honor, given to his widow and two sons in Geneva, he was also awarded the Order of Rio Branco, the highest honor from the Government of Brazil to be given to a citizen, the Pedro Ernesto Medal, the highest honor in his hometown of Rio de Janeiro, in 2003. In April 2004, Sérgio Vieira de Mello was posthumously awarded the "Statesman of the Year Award" by the EastWest Institute. Also in 2004, he received the Pax Christi International Peace Award.

Following the initiative of the Villa Decius Association, the Polish Prize of Sérgio Vieira de Mello was established in the year 2003 with the aim to promote human rights, democracy and tolerance and had its first edition in 2004.

Sérgio Vieira de Mello Center

The Sérgio Vieira de Mello Center was founded by his mother, Gilda Vieira de Mello, and Sergio's surviving spouse Carolina Larriera, also a former UN diplomat and Harvard trained professional, to honor his legacy, and works with a network of supporters out of Brazil, Sergio's country of nationality and Timor-Leste, the country he helped create – around the world.

The Sérgio Vieira de Mello Center works through a nationwide network of universities specialized in international relations and the future generation of world ambassadors. Specifically, the Sérgio Vieira de Mello Center focuses on the use of technology, entrepreneurism, and networks to mobilize mentors and disciples and build a sustainable peace model that can be easily replicated. It engages Harvard and MIT engineers and education professionals to empower local communities and schools. The Center matches ivory tower professionals with base of the pyramid and disenfranchised youth, identifying easily obtained opportunities. With ANAPRI, the National Association of International Relations Professionals is mobilizing Congress for more resources for the professionalization of the sector.

The Center engages and actively supports a network of more than one hundred schools and institutions bearing Sérgio's name in Brazil and abroad, and provides teaching tools and in-kind material. It also runs the Gilda Vieira de Mello for her Son Sergio Vieira de Mello awarded annually in Geneva.

Sergio Vieira de Mello Foundation

The Sergio Vieira de Mello Foundation was created in 2007 to honor his memory, pursue his ideals and continue his unfinished mission. The Foundation was established in Geneva, at the initiative of his two sons and his estranged wife, with some friends and colleagues. In 2008, Kofi Annan launched the first annual lecture, followed by Sadako Ogata in 2009, by Bernard Kouchner in 2010, by José Manuel Durão Barroso in 2011, and by Cornelio Sommaruga in 2012. Lectures take place at the Graduate Institute of International and Development Studies, in Geneva.

On 11 December 2008, the United Nations General Assembly made history when it adopted Swedish-sponsored GA Resolution A/63/L.49 on the Strengthening of the Coordination of Emergency Assistance of the United Nations, that amongst other important humanitarian decisions, decided to designate 19 August as the World Humanitarian Day (WHD). The Resolution gives for the first time, a special recognition to all humanitarian and United Nations and associated personnel who have worked in the promotion of the humanitarian cause and those who have died in the cause of duty and urges all Member States, entities of the United Nations within existing resources, as well as the other International Organizations and Non-Governmental Organizations to observe it annually in an appropriate way. As a background to this landmark resolution, the family of Sérgio Vieira de Mello resolved to work towards having 19 August recognized as a befitting tribute to all humanitarian personnel. Early April 2008 the Board of the Sérgio Vieira de Mello Foundation prepared a draft Resolution to be sponsored and adopted by the General Assembly designating 19 August as World Humanitarian Day. France, Switzerland, Japan and Brazil, contacted with the draft Resolution, agreed to co-sponsor it.

Sergio Vieira de Mello founded two Human Rights Agencies: the United Nations Housing Rights Programme and United Nations Human Rights Educational Project (UNHREP).  The former, currently a part of the United Nations Human Settlements Programme, aims to "assist States and other stakeholders with the implementation of their commitments in the Habitat Agenda". UNHREP aims to be "an educational facility for teaching Human Rights from a variety of angles. ... [as well as, eventually] international relations, conflict resolution, diplomacy and diplomatic etiquette".

After his death, the Italian city of Bologna has dedicated to Sergio Vieira de Mello a square (Piazza Sérgio Vieira de Mello) situated in a modern part of the central quartiere Navile.

Vieira de Mello's life was the subject of the 2020 biopic Sergio, starring Wagner Moura in the title role.

Career chronology

 1969–1971: French Editor, UNHCR, Geneva, Switzerland
 1971–1972: Project Officer, UNHCR, Dhaka, East Pakistan
 1972–1973: Programme Officer, UNHCR, Juba, Sudan
 1974–1975: Programme Officer, UNHCR, Nicosia, Cyprus
 1975–1977: Deputy Representative and Representative, UNHCR, Maputo, Mozambique
 1978–1980: Representative, UNHCR, Lima, Peru
 1980–1981: Head of Career Development and Training Unit of Personnel Section, UNHCR, Geneva, Switzerland
 1981–1983: Senior Political Officer, UNIFIL, DPKO, Lebanon
 1983–1985: Deputy Head of Personnel, UNHCR, Geneva, Switzerland
 1986–1988: Chef de Cabinet and Secretary to the executive committee, UNHCR, Geneva, Switzerland
 1988–1990: Director of Asia Bureau, UNHCR, Geneva, Switzerland
 1990–1991: Director of External Affairs, UNHCR, Geneva, Switzerland
 1991–1993: Director for Repatriation and Resettlement Operations, UNTAC, DPKO, and Special Envoy of High Commissioner Sadako Ogata, UNHCR, Phnom Penh, Cambodia
 1993–1994: Director of Political Affairs, UNPROFOR, DPKO, Sarajevo, Bosnia-Herzegovina
 1994–1996: Director of Operations and Planning, UNHCR, Geneva, Switzerland
 October–December 1996: Special Envoy of Secretary-General to the Great Lakes Region
 1996–1998: Assistant High Commissioner for Refugees, UNHCR, Geneva, Switzerland
 1998–2002: Under-Secretary-General for Humanitarian Affairs, UN, New York, US
 June–July 1999: Special Representative of Secretary-General to Kosovo
 1999–2002: Transitional Administrator, UNTAET, DPKO, and Special Representative of the Secretary-General of the United Nations, Dili, East Timor
 2002–2003: High Commissioner for Human Rights, Geneva, Switzerland
 May–August 2003: Special Representative of the UN Secretary-General to Iraq

See also

 List of peace activists
 Luiz Carlos da Costa
 World Humanitarian Day
 Sergio (2009 film) 
 Sergio (2020 film)

Further reading

 Jean-Claude Buhrer et Claude B. Levenson, Sergio Vieira de Mello, un espoir foudroyé. – Paris : Mille et une nuits, 2004. – 199 p., 20 cm. – .
 Leon Hartwell. 2022. Sergio Vieira de Mello: Lessons on Negotiating with the Devil. In Buffon, D., Hostetter, D., Howlett, C., and Peterson, C. Oxford Handbook of Peace History. Oxford University Press: Oxford. https://academic.oup.com/edited-volume/42641/chapter-abstract/375100825?redirectedFrom=fulltext 
 George Gordon-Lennox et Annick Stevenson, Sergio Vieira de Mello : un homme exceptionnel. – Genève : Éditions du Tricorne, 2004. – 143 p., 25 cm. – . – En appendice, choix de textes de Sergio Vieira de Mello.
 Jacques Marcovitch – USP – Sergio Vieira de Mello – pensamento e memória. 1 Edição | 2004 | Brochura 344p. | Cód.: 167075 |  (pt)

References

Bibliography

External links
  The Economist – "A brave man's journey"
 BBC News – Obituary: Sergio Vieira de Mello
 CNN – Sergio Vieira de Mello: A Rising Star
 Sergio Vieira de Mello Foundation
 En Route to Baghdad directed by Brazilian journalist Simone Duarte
  USP "Sergio Vieira de Mello: pensamento e memória" . (Portuguese language).
 Sergio Vieira de Mello [Undersecretary-General for Humanitarian Affairs and Emergency Relief Coordinator]
 UNHCHR Sergio Vieira de Mello
 PBS Independent Lens pages on "En Route To Baghdad" 
 UNHREP. The Final Project of the Man of Peace
 UN Special Nº671. DEAR FRIENDS OF SERGIO
 TED Talks Samantha Power: Shaking hands with the devil
 "Unsung Heroes of the Battlefields" by Laurent Vieira de Mello, president of the Sergio Vieira de Mello Foundation – The Washington Post, 19 August 2009

Interviews

 Interview with Human Rights Features
 Interview on Democracy Now!
 Interview on BBC News
 Can Kosovo recover? – Interview on PBS

Films

 Documentary film, Sergio (2009 film): En Route to Baghdad directed by Brazilian journalist Simone Duarte
 Biographical film Sergio, by Netflix, premiered at the Sundance Film Festival 28 January 2020, released in US on 17 April 2020.

1948 births
2003 deaths
University of Paris alumni
Brazilian terrorism victims
People killed in the Canal Hotel bombing
Brazilian people murdered abroad
Assassinated diplomats
People from Rio de Janeiro (city)
United Nations High Commissioners for Human Rights
University of Fribourg alumni
Under-Secretaries-General of the United Nations
Burials at Cimetière des Rois
United Nations Mission in Kosovo
Brazilian officials of the United Nations
Special Representatives of the Secretary-General of the United Nations
Special Envoys of the Secretary-General of the United Nations